Zakharovo is a rural locality (a village) in Filippovskoye Rural Settlement, Kirzhachsky District, Vladimir Oblast, Russia. The population was 10 as of 2010.

Geography 
Zakharovo is located on the Melyozha River, 24 km west from Kirzhach (the district's administrative centre) by road. Rozhkovo is the nearest rural locality.

References 

Rural localities in Kirzhachsky District